Kamut Lake is an irregularly shaped lake on the Canadian mainland, bordering the Northwest Territories and Nunavut. It is located east of Great Bear Lake. The Coppermine River is responsible for its inflow and outflow.

There is an archaeological site at the northeast end of the lake.

References

Lakes of Kitikmeot Region
Lakes of the Northwest Territories
Borders of Nunavut
Borders of the Northwest Territories